Udaltsov is a Russian surname. Notable people with the surname include:

 Alexander Udaltsov (historian) (1883–1958), Bolshevik historian
 Anastasia Udaltsova (born 1978), Russian politician
 Sergei Udaltsov (born 1977), Russian political activist

Russian-language surnames